Brotherus is a surname used first around 1600 by Stephan Sigfridi Brotherus, who was a priest in the town of Vantaa in Finland. There are currently about 100 people alive with this surname, most of whom are living in Finland.

Notable people
The botanist Viktor Ferdinand Brotherus was a well-known bearer of the name. Many living and deceased members of the family can be found from the Brotherus family database maintained by Robert Johannes Brotherus.

Elina Brotherus is a photographer who attended the Helsinki School.

Robert Brotherus is an American rally driver of Finnish origin, who helped bring back the Mount Washington Hillclimb Auto Race.

References